The Navistar T444E is a diesel V8 engine manufactured by Navistar International Corporation. In its use in Ford Motor Company trucks, vans, and school buses, it is the first of the PowerStroke family of diesel engines.   The T444E was manufactured from 1994 to 2003, replacing the 7.3 L IDI V8 designed by International Harvester. As a result of federal emission standards, the T444E was discontinued midway through the 2003 model year, replaced by the all-new 6.0 L VT365. In total, nearly 2 million 7.3 L PowerStroke V8s were manufactured for Ford at their Indianapolis, Indiana plant before switching to the 6.0 L.

The T444E used a  bore and stroke.

Applications:
 1994.5-1997 Ford F-250/F-350
 1999-2003 Ford Super Duty (2001-2006 in Australia)
 2000-2003 Ford Excursion
 1994.5-2003 Ford E-Series
 1994-2003  International 3400/3600/3700/3800 bus chassis
 1994-2003 International 3000 bus chassis
 1994-2003 International 4700/4900 cab/chassis

External links 
 

T444E
V8 engines
Diesel engines by model